The Cree SAM, designed and developed by the Swiss company Cree, is a prototype zero emission battery electric vehicle. It is a tadpole three-wheel car, with two seats in a tandem arrangement.

About 80 vehicles were produced for public testing in the Zurich and Basel area, in 2001 (SAM Electric Vehicle). In 2003 the company laid off all employees and applied for bankruptcy, but the shareholders including the original designer Daniel Ryhiner bought the company and kept  it running, as an investment offer.

In mid-2009 a Polish company, Impact Automotive Technologies (IAT, Pruszkow), was said to be developing a newer and faster version of the Cree SAM with a larger range. It was tested and received road certification in Italy, and was planned to produce 500 cars by the beginning of 2009.

External links
Cree the original website
Friends of Sam, official SAM website
SAM group
2008 developments
The new re-volt SAM (Polish, the English site is not responsive)
Impact Automotive Technologies The company that took over SAM development.

Electric cars
Cars of Switzerland
Plug-in hybrid vehicles